A Subah was the term for a province (State) in the Mughal Empire. The term was also used by other polities of the Indian subcontinent. The word is derived from Arabic and Persian. The governor/ruler of a Subah was known as a subahdar (sometimes also referred to as a "Subeh"), which later became subedar to refer to an officer in the Indian Army and Pakistan Army. The subahs were established by badshah (emperor) Akbar during his administrative reforms of years 1572–1580; initially they numbered to 12, but his conquests expanded the number of subahs to 15 by the end of his reign. Subahs were divided into Sarkars, or districts. Sarkars were further divided into Parganas or Mahals. His successors, most notably Aurangzeb, expanded the number of subahs further through their conquests. As the empire began to dissolve in the early 18th century, many subahs became effectively independent, or were conquered by the Marathas or the British. 

In modern context subah is a word used for province in Urdu language mainly in Pakistan.

History 

Initially, after the administrative reforms of Akbar, the Mughal empire was divided into 12 subahs : Kabul, Lahore, Multan, Delhi, Agra, Avadh, Illahabad, Bihar, Bangal, Malwa, Ajmer and Gujarat. After the conquest of Deccan, he created three more subahs there: Berar, Khandesh (initially renamed Dandesh in 1601) and Ahmadnagar (in 1636 renamed as Daulatabad and subsequently as Aurangabad). At the end of Akbar's reign, the number of subahs was thus 15. It was increased to 17 during the reign of Jahangir. Orissa was created as a separate subah, carved out of Bangalah in 1607. The number of subahs increased to 22 under Shah Jahan. In his 8th regnal year, Shah Jahan separated the sarkar of Telangana from Berar and made it into a separate Subah. In 1657, it was merged with Zafarabad Bidar subah. Agra was renamed Akbarabad 1629 and Delhi became Shahjahanbad in 1648. Kashmir was carved out of Kabul, Thatta (Sindh) out of Multan and Bidar out of Ahmadnagar. For some time Qandahar was a separate subah under the Mughal Empire but it was lost to Persia in 1648. Aurangzeb added Bijapur (1686), Sira (1687)  and Golkonda (1687) as new subahs. There were 22 subahs during his reign. These were Kabul, Kashmir, Lahore, Multan, Delhi, Agra, Avadh, Illahabad, Bihar, Bangalah, Orissa, Malwa, Ajmer, Gujarat, Berar, Khandesh, Aurangabad, Bidar, Thatta, Bijapur, Sira  and Haidarabad (Golkonda). During the reign of Aurangzeb, Arcot became a Mughal subah in 1692.

The Sikh Empire (1799–1849), originating in the Punjab region, also used the term Suba for the provinces it administered under its territorial delineation, of which there were five.

Current usage 
In modern usage in Urdu language, the term is used as a word for province, while the word riyasat ("princely state" in English) is used for (federated) state. The terminologies are based on administrative structure of British India which was partially derived from the Mughal administrative structure. In modern times, the term subah is mainly used in Pakistan, where its four provinces are called "Subah" in Urdu language.

List of Subahs of the Mughal Empire

Akbar's original twelve subahs 
The twelve subahs created as a result of the administrative reform by Akbar the Great:

Subahs added after 1595
The subahs which added later were (with dates established):

Gallery

Notes

References 
 Keay, John (2000). India: a History. Grove Press, New York.
 Markovits, Claude (ed.) (2004). A History of Modern India: 1480-1950. Anthem Press, London.

Further reading 
 

Subdivisions of the Mughal Empire
Types of administrative division
Urdu-language words and phrases